Fecteau is a surname of French origin. Notable people with the surname include:

Clément Fecteau (1933–2017), Canadian Roman Catholic prelate
Jean-Sébastien Fecteau (born 1975), Canadian pair skater
Richard Fecteau (born 1927), American Central Intelligence Agency agent
Ryan Fecteau (born 1992), American politician
Simon Olivier Fecteau (born 1975), Canadian director, actor, producer and screenwriter
Vincent Fecteau (born 1969), American sculptor

See also
Air Fecteau, defunct Canadian airlines

French-language surnames